This is a timeline documenting events of Jazz in the year 2007.

Events

January 
 17 – The 2nd Ice Music Festival Festival started in Geilo, Norway (January 17–19).

February
 1 – The 10th Polarjazz Festival 2007 started in Longyearbyen, Svalbard (February 1–4).

March
 2 – The 3rd Jakarta International Java Jazz Festival started in Jakarta, Indonesia (January 2 – 4).
 30
 The 34th Vossajazz started at Voss, Norway (March 30 – April 1).
 Snorre Bjerck was awarded Vossajazzprisen 2007.
 31 – Berit Opheim performs the commissioned work Ein engel går stilt for Vossajazz 2007.

April

May
 23 – The 35th Nattjazz started in Bergen, Norway (May 23 – June 2).
 25 – The 36th Moers Festival started in Moers, Germany (May 25 – 28).

June
 28 – The 27th Montreal International Jazz Festival started in Montreal, Quebec, Canada (June 28 - July 8).
 25 – The 19th Jazz Fest Wien started in Vienna, Austria (June 25 – July 12).

July
 4 – The 43nd Kongsberg Jazzfestival started in Kongsberg, Norway (July 4 – 7).
 6
 The 29th Copenhagen Jazz Festival started in Copenhagen, Denmark (July 6 – 15).
 The 41st Montreux Jazz Festival started in Montreux, Switzerland (July 6 – 21).
 13 – The 32nd North Sea Jazz Festival started in The Hague, Netherlands (July 13 – 15).
 14 – The 42nd Pori Jazz Festival started in Pori, Finland (July 14 – 22).
 16
 The 47th Moldejazz started in Molde, Norway (July 16 – 21).
 Arve Henriksen received the Radka Toneff Memorial Award at Moldejazz opening concert.
 17 – The 24th Stockholm Jazz Festival started in Stockholm, Sweden (July 17 – 21).
 18 – The 60th Nice Jazz Festival started in Nice, France (July 18 – 25).
 24 – The 42nd San Sebastian Jazz Festival started in San Sebastian, Spain (July 24 – 29).

August
 8 – The 21st Sildajazz started in Haugesund, Norway (August 8 – 12).
 9 – The 23rd Brecon Jazz Festival started in Brecon, Wales (August 9 – 12).
 10 – The 53rd Newport Jazz Festival started in Newport, Rhode Island (August 10 – 12).
 13 – The 22nd Oslo Jazzfestival started in Oslo, Norway (August 13 – 19).
 29 – The 3rd Punktfestivalen started in Kristiansand, Norway (August 29 – September 1).

September
 21 – The 50th Monterey Jazz Festival started in Monterey, California (September 21 – 23).

October

November
 16 – The 16th London Jazz Festival started in London, England (November 16 – 25).

December

Album released

January

February

March

April

May

June

July

August

September

October

November

December

Unknown date
#

A
 Sonic Codex by Eivind Aarset (Jazzland Recordings).

Deaths

 January
 4 — Dick Wetmore, American violinist and multi-instrumentalist (born 1927).
 12
 Alice Coltrane, American pianist, organist, harpist, singer, and composer (born 1937).
 Jimmy Cheatham, American trombonist (born 1924).
 13 – Michael Brecker, American saxophonist (leukemia), Brecker Brothers (born 1949).
 17 – Virtue Hampton Whitted, singer and bassist (born 1922).

 February
 1 — Whitney Balliett, American journalist and jazz critic (born 1926).
 12 – Eldee Young, American upright bassist (born 1936).
 24 – Leroy Jenkins, American violinist, violist, and composer (born 1932).
 25 – Al Viola, American guitarist (born 1919).
 27 – Bobby Rosengarden, American drummer (born 1924).

 March
 27 – Hitoshi Ueki, Japanese actor, comedian, singer, and guitarist (born 1926).
 28 – Tony Scott, American clarinetist and arranger (born 1921).

 April
 1 — Danny Barcelona, American drummer (born 1929).
 10 – Dakota Staton, American vocalist (born 1930).
 14 – Herman Riley, American saxophonist (born 1933).
 20 – Andrew Hill, American pianist (born 1931).
 28 – Tommy Newsom, American saxophonist (born 1929).

 May
 6
 Alvin Batiste, American clarinetist (born 1932).
 Nükhet Ruacan, Turkish singer and educator in musicology ( (born 1951).
 9 – Carla White, American vocalist (born 1951).
 15 – Al Arsenault, American organist (born 1938).
 24 – Buddy Childers, American trumpeter, composer, and ensemble leader (born 1926).

 June 
 8 — Nellie Lutcher, American singer and pianist (born 1912).
 18 – Bill Barder, American tubist (born 1920).

 July
 4 — Johnny Frigo, American jazz violinist and bassist (born 1916).
 5 — George Melly, British vocalist (born 1926).
 6 — Don Mumford, American drummer (born 1954).
 23 – Jon Marks, American pianist (born 1947).
 28 – Sal Mosca, American pianist (born 1927).
 29 – Art Davis, American upright bassist (born 1934).

 August
 1 — Ronaldo Folegatti, Brazilian composer, guitarist, and record producer (born 1958).
 5 — Paul Rutherford, English free improvising trombonist (born 1940).
 10 – Mario Rivera, Dominican Republic saxophonist (born 1939).
 11 – Herb Pomeroy, American trumpeter (born 1930).
 16 – Max Roach, American drummer (born 1924).
 18 – Jon Lucien, Virgin Islands singer and musician (born 1942).
 27 – Doug Riley, Canadian pianist and keyboardist (born 1945).

 September
 1 — Juma Santos, percussionist and drummer (born 1948).
 11 – Joe Zawinul, Austrian keyboardist and composer (skin cancer), Weather Report (born 1932).
 15
 Aldemaro Romero, Venezuelan pianist, composer, arranger, and orchestral conductor (born 1928).
 Gordon "Specs" Powell, American drummer and percussionist (born 1922).
 19 – Mike Osborne, English alto saxophonist, pianist, and clarinetist (born 1941).

  October
 3 — Lloyd Trotman, American upright bassist (born 1923).
 5 — Jack Wilson, American pianist and composer (born 1936).
 15 – Emil Mijares, Filipino vibist and pianist (born 1935).
 17 – Teresa Brewer, American singer (born 1931).
 21 – Donald Ayler, American trumpeter (born 1942).

 November
 16 – Grethe Kausland, Norwegian actress and singer (lung cancer) (born 1947).
 20 – Ernest "Doc" Paulin, American musician (born 1907).
 22 – Cecil Payne, American jazz baritone saxophonist (born 1927).

 December
 4 — Carlos Valdes, Cuban-American conga player (born 1926).
 14 – Frank Morgan, American saxophonist (born 1933).
 23 – Oscar Peterson, Canadian pianist (born 1925).

See also

 List of 2007 albums
 List of years in jazz
 2000s in jazz
 2007 in music

References

External links 
 History Of Jazz Timeline: 2007 at All About Jazz

2000s in jazz
Jazz